The Chittagong Hill Tracts, often shortened to simply the Hill Tracts and abbreviated to CHT, are group of districts within the Chittagong Division in southeastern Bangladesh, bordering India and Myanmar (Burma). Covering , they formed a single district until 1984, when they were divided into three districts: Khagrachari District, Rangamati Hill District, and Bandarban District.

Topographically, the Hill Tracts are the only extensively hilly area in Bangladesh. It was historically settled by many tribal refugees from Burma Arakan in 16th century and now it is settled by the Jumma people. Today, it remains one of the least developed parts of Bangladesh.

The Chattogram Hill Tracts along with Ladakh, Sikkim, Tawang, Darjeeling, Bhutan and Sri Lanka, constitute some of the remaining abodes of Buddhism in South Asia.

Geography
The Chittagong Hill Tracts (CHT), the only extensive hilly area in Bangladesh, lie in the southeastern part of the country (210 25' N to 230 45' N latitude and 910 54' E to 920 50' E longitude) bordering Myanmar on the southeast, the Indian state of Tripura on the north, Mizoram on the east and Chittagong district on the west. The area of the Chittagong Hill Tracts is about 13, 184 km2, which is approximately one-tenth of the total area of Bangladesh. The Chittagong Hill Tracts combine three hilly districts of Bangladesh: Rangamati, Khagrachhari and Bandarban districts.
The mountainous rugged terrain with deep forests, lakes and falls gives it a different character from the rest of Bangladesh.

Demography
According to the census of 1991, the population was 974,447, of whom 501,114 were tribal people and the rest were from the Bengali (Muslim and Hindu) community. The tribal populations include the Chakma, Marma, Tripura, Tanchangya, Assamese, Keot (Kaibarta), Chak, Pankho, Mro, Murang, Bom, Lushei, Khyang, and Khumi, and differ markedly from the Bengali majority of Bangladesh in language, culture, physical appearance, religion, dress and farming methods.

The population of the three districts (zilas) totalled 1,598,000 in the returns of the census of 2011, making the population density roughly 120 per km2. They are mainly followers of Buddhism (43.9%). The percentages of Muslims are: Bandarban 50.8%, Khagrachari 44.7% and Rangamati 35.1%. Most of the Christian population is in Bandarban.

History

During the 15th century it was controlled by the Twipra Kingdom. It was the warzone between the Arakan Kingdom and the Twipra Kingdom. Under British control, the British East India Company appointed chiefs to collect taxes from people. This was done in regional areas known as Chakma Circle, Mong Circle, and Bohmong Circle.
The early history of the Chittagong Hill Tracts is a record of constantly recurring raids by the eastern hill tribes (Mizo or Lushai) and of the operations undertaken to repress them. In the early 16th century the Chakma people came from Arakan (Burma) due to repression and hostility by Rakhaine people. The Chakma are the single largest tribe, comprising half of the tribal population. The Marma people are the second largest tribe. They came from Burma when Arakan was conquered by Burmese king Bodawpaya. The tribal peoples that emigrated from Burma due to repression by the Burmese king settled in the Hill Tracts with the consent of Subedar of Bengal, who was the representative of the Mughal emperor.

Mughal and early British records name the region Jum Bungoo, Jum mahal or Kapas mahal. In 1787, the East India Company made the region its tributary after battling tribal leaders.

British rule
The use of the name Chittagong for this area dates to the 1860 British annexation of the region, bringing it under the direct control of British India. Situated beyond the inland hills, Chittagong proper is a coastal area in the plains where the British were based. As colonial influence grew, "Chittagong" enlarged as well, expanding eastwards to subsume the Hill Tracts under its revenue-collection territory.

The recorded population increased from 69,607 in 1872 to 101,597 in 1881, to 107,286 in 1891, and to 124,762 in 1901.  The census of 1872 was, however, very imperfect, and the actual population growth probably did not exceed what might be expected in a sparsely inhabited but fairly healthy tract.

When the 1901 census was taken there were no towns, and 211 of the villages had populations of less than 500 apiece; only one exceeded 2,000. The population density, excluding the area of uninhabited forest (1,385 square miles), was 33 persons per square mile. There was a little immigration from Chittagong, and a few persons had emigrated to Tripura. The proportion of females to every 100 males was only 90 in the district-born, and 83 in the total population. Buddhists numbered 83,000, Hindus 36,000, and Muslims 5,000.

The Chittagong Hill Tracts, combining three hilly districts of Bangladesh, were once known as Korpos Mohol, the name used until 1860. In 1860 it was annexed by the British and was made an administrative district of Bengal. Administratively, the Chittagong Hill Tracts were divided into three circles, namely the Chakma Circle, the Bohmong Circle, and the Mong Circle, each presided over by a hereditary chief from the Chakma and Marma peoples. As of today, it is a semi-autonomous region within Bangladesh comprising the districts of Chengmi (Khagrachari District), Gongkabor (Rangamati Hill District), and Arvumi (Bandarban District).

End of British rule 

The last viceroy, Louis Mountbatten, 1st Earl Mountbatten of Burma, who considered the grant of independence to India as his act of crowning glory, was ambitious to achieve this "superhuman" task in record time. He said that before accepting the post of viceroy, he had told George VI, who was his cousin: "I am prepared to accept the job only on one condition. India must be granted independence by July, 1948 and I will not stay there a day longer". Mountbatten came to India in March 1947 and this left him just about sixteen months to complete such a gigantic task. In reality, he achieved it in five months, on 15 August 1947, for which he was given much credit, despite intense violence.

The Boundary Commission's award was originally been to be made public on 13 August. But Mountbatten was reluctant to make this public. According to Philip Ziegler, the author of Mountbatten's official biography, the case of the Chittagong Hill Tracts was uppermost in Mountbatten's mind. Mountbatten "foresaw an Independence Day marred by rancour, Nehru boycotting the ceremonies, India born in an atmosphere not of euphoria but of angry resentment." So Mountbatten decided to announce the award only on 16 August when the celebrations were over. As Zeigler writes, "India's indignation at the award of the Chittagong Hill Tracts to Pakistan may have been a factor in making up Mountbatten's mind to keep the reports to himself till after independence".

Mountbatten was himself surprised by the ferocity of Vallabhbhai Patel's reaction to the issue. In his memoirs he wrote, "The one man I had regarded as a real statesman with both his feet firmly on the ground, and a man of honour whose word was his bond, had turned out to be as hysterical as the rest. Candidly I was amazed that such a terrific crisis should have blown up over so small a matter. However, I have been long enough in India to realise that major crises are by no means confined to big matters."  Leonard Mosley in his book The Last Days of the British Raj puts it as "a matter for Mountbatten's conscience".

Conflict

The conflict in the Chittagong Hill Tracts dates back to when Bangladesh was the eastern wing of Pakistan. Widespread resentment occurred over the displacement of as many as 100,000 native people due to the construction of the Kaptai Dam in 1962. The displaced did not receive compensation from the government and many thousands fled to India.

After The Liberation War, a convoy of Bangladesh army was ambushed by Shanti Bahini militants from the Hill Tracts. More than 90+ soldiers were killed and several of them were heavily injured. This was the first bloodshed in the Hill Tracts. After this massacre, Bangladesh deployed an army there. After some days, the Shanti Bahini started killing civilians in the Tracts. Many soldiers of the Bangladesh army were killed or injured by them.

Following years of unrest, an agreement was formed between the government of Bangladesh and the tribal leaders which granted a limited level of autonomy to the elected council of the three hill districts.

The 1997 Chittagong Hill Tracts Peace Accord signed between the then-government of Sheikh Hasina and the Parbatya Chattagram Jana Samhati Samiti was opposed by opposition parties as well as a fraction of the tribal rebels. Opposition parties argued that the autonomy granted in the treaty ignored the Bengali community. The succeeding Khaleda Zia government promised to implement the peace treaty, despite their opposition to it during the previous government's term. According to the Ministry of Chittagong Hill Tracts Affairs, a peace treaty between the Government of Bangladesh and Parbattya Chattagram Jana Samhati Samiti was signed on 2 December 1997.

Land use and environment

Tobacco cultivation
Tobacco cultivation is damaging the ecology of the area, with loss of indigenous trees such as Chukrasia tabularis (Indian mahogany), and soil fertility. Many of the farmers of Rangamati, Bandarban and Khagrachhari districts of Bangladesh have been losing their interests in cultivating indigenous crops like paddy, banana, maize, sesame, cotton, potato, pumpkin etc. as they became defaulters of loans provided by tobacco companies, they said.

Environmental issues 
Like other mountainous areas in South and Southeast Asia, the Chittagong Hill Tracts are undergoing deforestation and land degradation arising from environmentally unsuitable activities such as tobacco cultivation in sloping land, shifting cultivation and logging. Shifting cultivation, also known as slash-and-burn agriculture or swidden cultivation, embraces a large variety of primitive forms of agriculture. It is a special stage in the evolution from hunting and food gathering to sedentary farming. Mankind began to change its mode of life from food gatherer to food producer about 7000 B.C. by adopting shifting cultivation. Some form of shifting cultivation has been practised in most parts of the world, but more intensive forms of agriculture have subsequently replaced it.
 

The present shifting cultivation system with short fallow period in the Chittagong Hill Tracts has accelerated erosion, land degradation, deforestation, and impoverishment of tribal people in CHT. If the present state of degradation is continued, most of the areas under shifting cultivation will be severely degraded and future generations will face more difficulties in eking out their livelihoods on further degraded land, although there is some scope for shifting cultivators to leave the degraded fields and move to other areas. It is estimated that on average eight hectares of land is necessary for the sustenance of a family in the Chittagong Hill Tracts. If this ratio is adopted, 1, 240, 000 ha land is required to sustain the present population; however, the total land available, excluding the reserve forest, is 928, 000 ha. Shifting cultivation, therefore, cannot fulfill even the subsistence requirements of the people. In such a situation, either large non-farm employment opportunities need to be created or more productive land-use systems need to be developed and adopted. Given the sluggish growth of the economy, there is limited scope for generating adequate non-farming employment opportunities in the near future. It is, therefore, imperative to replace the present shifting cultivation system with more productive and sustainable land use systems to enable people to secure their livelihoods.

Bibliography
 Bangladesh: Militarization in the Chittagong Hill Tracts. – The slow demise of the region's indigenous peoples. IWGIA report 14. Copenhagen: IWGIA, Organising Committee CHT Campaign and Shimin Gaikou Centre. May 2012
 Shapan Adnan & Ranajit Dastidar.  Alienation of the Lands of Indigenous Peoples of the Chittagong Hill Tracts of Bangladesh. Dhaka: Chittagong Hill Tracts Commission & IWGIA May 2011.
 Shelly, Mizanur Rahaman. (1992). The Chittagong Hill Tracts of Bangladesh: The Untold Story. Dhaka, Bangladesh: Centre for Development Research, Bangladesh.
 Life is not Ours: Land and Human Rights in the Chittagong Hill Tracts, Bangladesh. Copenhagen, Denmark: Organizing Committee, Chittagong Hill Tracts Campaign, 1991.
 Brauns, Claus-Dieter, "The Mrus: Peaceful Hillfolk of Bangladesh", National Geographic Magazine, February 1973, Vol 143, No 1

References

Citations

External links

 Chittagong Hill Tracts mapped on OpenStreetMap, retrieved 28 December 2021. (Also shown are three districts: Khagrachari, Rangamaai, and Bandarban, that make up the tracts)
 Official website of The Chittagong Hill Tracts Commission
 Chittagong Hill Tracts in Banglapedia
 Background information, news and literature on the Chittagong Hill Tracts
 Survival International
 Ali, M. Emran and Toshiyuki Tsuchiya, Land Rights of the Indigenous People of the Chittagong Hill Tracts in Bangladesh: A Historical Analysis of Policy Issues. Fourth World Journal, Volume 5, Number 1.

 
Chittagong Division
.
Mountains of Bangladesh
Bandarban District
Khagrachhari District
Rangamati Hill District
History of Chittagong Division
Indigenous land rights
Geography of Chittagong Division